Mirko Tedeschi (born 17 December 1987 in Gallarate) is an Italian cyclist, who last rode for .

Major results

2008
 10th Piccolo Giro di Lombardia
2010
 6th Piccolo Giro di Lombardia
 8th Ruota d'Oro
 10th Trofeo Edil C
2012
 5th Piccolo Giro di Lombardia
2013
 1st GP Industria Commercio Artigianato-Botticino
 1st Trofeo MP Filtri
 6th Trofeo Edil C
2014
 1st  Mountains classification Settimana Internazionale di Coppi e Bartali
 2nd Overall Course de la Solidarité Olympique
 4th Giro del Medio Brenta
 5th Coppa della Pace
 6th Trofeo Alcide Degasperi
 10th Overall Rás Tailteann

See also
Mirko Tedeschi (cyclist, born 1989)

References

External links

1987 births
Living people
Italian male cyclists
People from Gallarate
Cyclists from the Province of Varese